Steven Glenwood MacLean  (born  December 14, 1954) is a Canadian astronaut. He was the president of the Canadian Space Agency, from September 1, 2008, to February 1, 2013.

He was born in Ottawa, Ontario, and is married to Nadine Wielgopolski of Hull, Quebec. They have three children. He enjoys hiking, canoeing, flying, parachuting and gymnastics. In 2013 he returned to physics research as an associate member of the Institute for Quantum Computing (IQC) at the University of Waterloo.

Personal
MacLean attended Merivale High School in Nepean, Ontario. He received a Bachelor of Science degree in physics in 1977 and a doctorate in physics in 1983 from York University in Toronto. In 1977, he received the President's Award at York University (Murray G. Ross Award).  He is a recipient of a Natural Sciences and Engineering Research Council post graduate scholarship in 1980, two Ontario graduate scholarships, one in 1981 and the other in 1982, and a Natural Sciences and Engineering Research Council postdoctoral fellowship in 1983.

He is an honorary fellow of Norman Bethune College at York University and president of the board of directors for the Mont Megantic Observatory project.

From 1974 to 1976, MacLean worked in sports administration and public relations at York University. From 1976 to 1977, he was a member of the Canadian National Gymnastics Team. He taught part-time at York University from 1980 to 1983. In 1983, he became a visiting scholar at Stanford University under Nobel Laureate Arthur Leonard Schawlow. He is a laser-physicist, and his research has included work on electro-optics, laser-induced fluorescence of particles and crystals and multi-photon laser spectroscopy.

From October 22 to November 1, 1992, MacLean flew onboard Space Shuttle Columbia as a payload specialist for Mission STS-52. During this mission, he performed a set of seven experiments known as CANEX-2, which included an evaluation of the Space Vision System.

MacLean served as a mission specialist on STS-115, which launched on September 9, 2006, and returned on September 21, 2006. He became the first Canadian to operate the robotic arm Canadarm2. On September 13, he performed his first spacewalk, a 7-hour EVA to activate the solar panels on the P3/4 truss – the second Canadian to do so, after Chris Hadfield.

Honours
In 1994, he received an honorary doctorate from the Collège militaire royal de Saint-Jean in Quebec, York University, Acadia University in Wolfville, Nova Scotia. In September 2006, Steve MacLean Public School was opened in Ottawa, named after him. In 2010 he visited the school on the occasion of the principal's retirement.
MacLean was chosen as one of the first six astronauts in December 1983. He began to do training in February 1984. From 1987 to 1993 MacLean worked as a program manager for CSVS. MacLean was the chief science advisor for the International Space Station from 1993 to 1994. He was also program manager for the Advanced Space Vision System in 1987 to 1993. MacLean is an honorary Fellow of the Royal Canadian Geographical Society.

References

External links
 Canadian Space Agency President's biography
 NASA astronaut biography
 Spacefacts biography of Steven MacLean

1954 births
Canadian astronauts
Living people
People from Ottawa
Presidents of the Canadian Space Agency
Academic staff of the University of Toronto
York University alumni
Royal Military College Saint-Jean people
Royal Canadian Geographical Society fellows
Space Shuttle program astronauts
Spacewalkers